Perfect World may refer to:

Film and television 
A Perfect World, a 1993 Clint Eastwood film
Perfect World (film), a 2018 Japanese film by Kenji Shibayama
Perfect World (TV series), a 2000 British sitcom starring Paul Kaye
 A Perfect World (audio drama), a 2008 audio play based on the TV series Doctor Who
Perfect World Pictures, a Chinese film and television production company

Music 
Perfect World (band), an American rock band

Albums 
Perfect World (Clint Crisher album) or the title song, 1999
Perfect World (Eiko Shimamiya album) or the title song, 2010
Perfect World (Perfect World album), 2003
Perfect World (Twice album), 2021
Perfect World (Uniform album) or the title song, 2015
A Perfect World, by Takida, 2016

Songs 
"Perfect World" (Broken Bells song), 2014
"Perfect World" (Gossip song), 2012
"Perfect World" (Huey Lewis and the News song), 1988
"Perfect World" (Marcella Detroit song), 1995
"Perfect World", by Ace of Base from The Bridge, 1995
"Perfect World", by Anggun from Toujours un ailleurs, 2015
"Perfect World", by Billy Talent from Billy Talent II, 2006
"Perfect World", by Liz Phair from whitechocolatespaceegg, 1998
"Perfect World", by Method Man from Tical 2000: Judgement Day, 1998
"Perfect World", by Peter Cetera from Another Perfect World, 2001
"Perfect World", by Simple Plan from Still Not Getting Any..., 2003
"Perfect World", by Steve Miller Band from Wide River, 1993
"Perfect World", by Sublime from Everything Under the Sun, 2006
"Perfect World", by Talking Heads from Little Creatures, 1985
"Perfect World", by Twice from Perfect World, 2021

Video games 
 Perfect World (video game), a 2005 massively multiplayer online game
Perfect World (company), a China-based online game company

Other 
Perfect World (manga), a Japanese manga series.

See also
The Perfect World Foundation, a nature conservation NGO
In a Perfect World (disambiguation)
Utopia